This is a list of buildings and structures in Venice, Italy.

A 
 Ala Napoleonica
 Arsenal
 Ateneo Veneto

B 
 Biblioteca Marciana

C 

 Ca' da Mosto
 Ca' d'Oro
 Ca' Farsetti
 Ca' Foscari
 Ca' Loredan
 Ca' Pesaro
 Ca' Rezzonico
 Ca' Tron
 Ca' Vendramin Calergi
 Campanile di San Marco
 Campo San Polo
 Campo San Samuele
 Campo San Zanipolo
 Campo Santa Margherita
 Campo Sant'Angelo
 Corte del Milion

D 
 Dogana da Mar
 Doge's Palace

F 
 Fabbriche Nuove di Rialto (Erberia)
 Fabbriche Vecchie di Rialto
 La Fenice
 Fondaco del Megio
 Fondaco dei Tedeschi
 Fondaco dei Turchi
 Fondazione Querini Stampalia
 Forte di Sant'Andrea

G–O 
 Giardinetti Reali
 Italian Synagogue
 Loggette di San Marco
 Mercerie
 Mulino Stucky
 Murano Glass Museum
 Museo Storico Navale
 Museo di Palazzo Mocenigo
 Oratorio dei Crociferi

P

R 
 Rio di San Lorenzo

S 
 Scala di Bovolo
 Scuola dei Greci
 Scuola della Carità, home of the Gallerie dell'Accademia
 Scuola di San Giorgio degli Schiavoni
 Scuola di Santa Orsola
 Scuola Grande dei Carmini
 Scuola Grande di San Giovanni Evangelista
 Scuola Grande di San Marco
 Scuola Grande di San Rocco
 Scuola vecchia della Misericordia
 Spanish Synagogue
 Stadio Pier Luigi Penzo
 Strada Nuova

T–Z 
 Torre dell'Orologio
 Venezia Mestre railway station
 Venezia Santa Lucia railway station
 Via 2 Aprile
 Via 22 Marzo
 Via Garibaldi
 Zecca of Venice

See also
 List of churches in Venice
 Opera houses and theatres of Venice

 
Venice
Buildings